Anarchist Immigrants in Spain and Argentina is a 2015 history book by James A. Baer on the intertwined anarchist movements of Spain and Argentina.

Bibliography

External links 
 

2015 non-fiction books
English-language books
History books about anarchism
Anarchism in Argentina
Anarchism in Spain
University of Illinois Press books